The Grupo Albatros (Albatross Group) is a special operations service of the Prefectura Naval Argentina. Located in the province of Buenos Aires, it conducts river and maritime operations in the lakes and rivers and anything close to the coast line. In addition to Counter-Terrorist missions, they handle search and rescue and criminal responses.
The Albatros group uses specialized weapons and gear such as the Beretta 92 pistol, SIG SG550, IWI X95, FN FAL assault rifles, Heckler & Koch MP5 submachine gun, Franchi SPAS-15 combat shotgun and the SIG Sauer SSG 3000 sniper rifle.

See also
Scorpion Group
Hawk Special Operations Brigade
Federal Special Operations Group
Special Operations Troops Company
Argentine Federal Police

Albatros
Federal law enforcement agencies of Argentina